Darul Aman may refer to:
 Darulaman, an area in the outskirts of Kabul, Afghanistan
 Darul Aman Palace, a palace in Darulaman
 Darul Aman Stadium, a stadium in Alor Star, Kedah, Malaysia
 Darul Aman Highway, a highway in Kedah, Malaysia
 Darul Aman Juma Masjid, a mosque in Darul Aman campus.
 Kedah Darul Aman, a state of Malaysia
 Dar-ul-Amaan (also spelled as Dar-ul-Aman, Dar ul Aman or Darul Aman), a type of women's shelter homes in Pakistan